Smoky Mountain Wrestling was a professional wrestling promotion based in Knoxville, Tennessee from 1991 to 1995. Former employees in SMW consisted of professional wrestlers, managers, play-by-play and color commentators, announcers, interviewers and referees.

Alumni

Male wrestlers

Female wrestlers

Stables and tag teams

Managers and valets

Commentators and interviewers

Referees

References
General

Specific

External links
Smoky Mountain Wrestling alumni at Cagematch.net

Smoky Mountain Wrestling alumni at OWW.com
Smoky Mountain Wrestling alumni at Wrestlingdata.com
Pro Wrestling Statistics: Smoky Mountain Wrestling (1991 to 1995)

Smoky Mountain Wrestling alumni
Smoky Mountain Wrestling